The Lifan 820 is a four-door mid-size sedan produced by the Lifan Motors division of Lifan Group.

Overview 

Launched in 2014 at the Beijing Auto Show, the Lifan 820 was available to the Chinese market in 2015 with a price range of 81,800 yuan to 119,800 yuan, and was later adjusted to 76,800 yuan to 119,800 yuan as of 2019.

Powertrain
Engine options for the 820 includes a 4-cylinder engines 1.8 L engine producing 133 hp with a torque of 168N·m, and a 4-cylinder engines 2.4 L engine producing 167 hp with a torque of 226N·m.

Lifan 820EV 

Revealed during the 2015 Shanghai Auto Show, the Lifan 820EV is the electric version of the Lifan 820 mid-size sedan. The Lifan 820EV is powered by a 190 hp electric motor with a torque of 440 N·m. According to official numbers by Lifan, top speed of the 820EV is 150 km/h and the maximum range is 400 km.

References

External links

Lifan Motors website

Sedans
820
Cars introduced in 2014
Mid-size cars
2010s cars
Cars of China